The 87th running of the Tour of Flanders cycling race in Belgium was held on Sunday 6 April 2003. Belgian Peter Van Petegem won his second victory in the monument classic. The race started in Bruges and finished in Meerbeke (Ninove).

Race Summary
Previous winner Jacky Durand was in an early breakaway with Michael Rich, Thomas Liese and Vincent van der Kooij. They were caught by a group of eight, consisting only of Italians, at 60 km from the finish, before the peloton returned at 30 km. Peter Van Petegem attacked on Tenbosse, followed by 10 others, heading to the Muur van Geraardsbergen. On the Muur, 16 km before the finish, Van Petegem broke clear with Frank Vandenbroucke, pushing on to the finish. Van Petegem beat his fellow Belgian in a two-man sprint. Australian Stuart O'Grady won the sprint for third place.

Climbs
There were 19 categorized climbs:

Results

External links
 Recap of the race (Flemish television)

References

Tour of Flanders
Tour of Flanders
Tour of Flanders
Tour of Flanders
April 2003 sports events in Europe